Durbin, Kentucky is an unincorporated community situated along Kentucky Route 752 and Durbin Creek in southern Boyd County, Kentucky. The post office was established on March 5, 1900, with Robert Struther as postmaster, and was named for Amos Durbin, an early explorer. It is located within the ZIP Code Tabulation Area for zip code 41129, which includes the city of Catlettsburg.

References

Unincorporated communities in Boyd County, Kentucky
Unincorporated communities in Kentucky